Karl Görner may refer to:

Karl Friedrich Görner, German organist
Karl August Görner (1806–1884), German actor, director and playwright